Coleophora vibicigerella is a moth of the family Coleophoridae found in Asia, Europe and north Africa. It was first described by Philipp Christoph Zeller in 1839.

Description
The wingspan is 10.5–14 mm. Adults are on wing in late May and June.

The larvae feed on yarrow (Achillea millefolium) and field wormwood (Artemisia campestris). They create a laterally strongly compressed, two-valved, black silken case, which is narrowed behind the mouth. The mouth angle is about 0°. Larvae can be found from September to May.

Distribution
It is found from Sweden and Finland to the Iberian Peninsula, Italy and Bulgaria and from Great Britain to the Baltic states. It is also found in North Africa, China and Korea.

References

vibicigerella
Moths described in 1839
Moths of Africa
Moths of Asia
Moths of Europe
Taxa named by Philipp Christoph Zeller